Allahlu or Lalahlu or Lalehlu may refer to:
Allahlu, Ardabil
Allahlu, Khoda Afarin, East Azerbaijan province
Allahlu, Mianeh, East Azerbaijan province
Allahlu, Varzaqan, East Azerbaijan province
Lalahlu-ye Torab, West Azerbaijan province